Duverney is a French toponymic surname. Notable people with the surname include:

  (1688–1761), French doctor and anatomist, son of Guichard Joseph Duverney
 Guichard Joseph Duverney or Joseph-Guichard Du Verney (1648–1730), French anatomist
  (1661–1748), French doctor and anatomist, brother of Guichard Joseph Duverney
 Joseph Paris Duverney (1684–1770), French banker
  (1653–1728), French surgeon, brother of Guichard Joseph Duverney

See also

References 

French-language surnames